Łukasz Bocian (born 29 May 1988) is a Polish footballer who currently plays for GKS Tychy.

External links
 

1988 births
Living people
Polish footballers
GKS Bełchatów players
Kolejarz Stróże players
GKS Tychy players
Place of birth missing (living people)
Association football midfielders